Enumclaw School District No. 216 is a public school district located in southern King County, Washington, headquartered in Enumclaw.

Boundary
The district's boundary includes all of Enumclaw, the vast majority of Black Diamond, areas with Ravensdale postal addresses, and several unincorporated areas.

The district is bordered by the Tahoma School District to the north and to its northwest sits the fourth most populous school district in Washington state, the Kent School District. To its west lies the Auburn School District and below it in the south is the White River School District, which is in Pierce County.

Schools 
The Enumclaw School District has eight active schools in total, five elementary schools, two middle schools, and one high school.

High schools 
Enumclaw High School - Students: 1,325 (2021 - 2022) - Teachers: 73 (2020 - 2021) - Mascot: Hornets - School Colors: Maroon + Gold

Middle schools 
Enumclaw Middle School - Students: 489 (2021 - 2022) - Teachers: 33 (2020 - 2021)
 Thunder Mountain Middle School - Students: 492 (2021 - 2022) - Teachers: 28 (2020 - 2021)

Elementary schools 
Black Diamond Elementary School - Students: 393 (2021 - 2022) - Teachers: 30 (2020 - 2021)
 Byron Kibler Elementary School - Students: 410 (2021 - 2022) - Teachers: 37 (2020 - 2021)
 Southwood Elementary School - Students: 300 (2021 - 2022) - Teachers: 29 (2020 - 2021)
 Sunrise Elementary School - Students: 392 (2021 - 2022) - Teachers: 32 (2020 - 2021)
 Westwood Elementary School - Students: 288 (2021 - 2022) - Teachers: 32 (2020 - 2021)

Demographics

Student demographics

Classroom teacher demographics

References

External links

 
 OSPI District Report Card, 2010-11

School districts in Washington (state)
School districts established in 1887
Education in King County, Washington
1887 establishments in Washington Territory